Frederick Titmuss (15 February 1898 – 2 October 1966) was an English footballer who played as a full-back for Southampton, Plymouth Argyle and St Austell, and also made two appearances for England.

Career
He joined Southampton as soon as hostilities were over and made a handful of appearances in friendly matches before the resumption of league football. Although Titmuss considered himself to be a left-winger, he was soon converted into an outstanding left-back. He played his first competitive match on the opening day of the 1919–20 Southern League season and quickly formed a partnership with Tom Parker, who were described as "the best pair of backs in the South".

Southampton were champions of Division Three (South) in 1922 conceding only 21 goals, with Titmuss an ever-present. According to Holley & Chalk's "Alphabet of the Saints", "his speciality was the slide tackle although his perfect positional play often meant that such 'last ditch' defending was hardly ever needed."

Honours
Southampton
Football League Third Division South champions: 1921–22

References

External links
Plymouth Argyle career details

1898 births
1966 deaths
People from North Hertfordshire District
English footballers
Association football fullbacks
England international footballers
Southern Football League players
Southampton F.C. players
Plymouth Argyle F.C. players
A.F.C. St Austell players
Lancashire Fusiliers soldiers
British Army personnel of World War I